The 2019 Hambleton District Council election took place on 2 May 2019 to elect members of the Hambleton District Council in England. It was held on the same day as other local elections.

Results summary

Ward results

Appleton Wiske & Smeatons

Bagby & Thorntons

Bedale

Easingwold

Great Ayton

Huby

Hutton Rudby

Morton-on-Swale

Northallerton North & Brompton

Northallerton South

Osmotherley & Swainby

Raskelf & White Horse

Romanby

Sowerby & Topcliffe

Stokesley

Tanfield

Thirsk

By-elections

Raskelf & White Horse

References

2019 English local elections
May 2019 events in the United Kingdom
2019
2010s in North Yorkshire